Doireann MacDermott (born 13 December 1923) is an Irish translator, writer, an academic in the field of Spanish philology, and a retired professor of English studies at the University of Barcelona. She pioneered the study of the language and literature of the English-speaking countries of the former Commonwealth.

Early life 
MacDermott was born in Dublin, Ireland, in 1923 to an Irish father, Anthony MacDermott, who was an officer in the British Royal Navy and a Canadian mother, Evelyn Goodridge, who was born in  St. John's, Newfoundland and Labrador and educated in Germany. From 1924 to 1930 she lived with her family in Bad Ischl, Austria. In 1930 they moved to the Isle of Wight, off the southwestern coast of England. In 1939, her brother, Diarmuid MacDermott, died in the sinking of the British warship , which was sunk by a German U-boat in Scapa Flow, off the northern coast of Scotland, at the beginning of the Second World War. In 1941 she enlisted in the Royal Navy, serving in various ports in the south-west of England, all of which were heavily bombarded.

Academic career 
In 1947, she began her studies at the Royal Holloway College at the University of London and obtained a degree in 1950. She took a French course at the University of Geneva, Switzerland, where she met her future husband, Ramón Carnicer Blanco. From 1950 to 1952 she taught at an international school in Switzerland. In 1952, she settled in Barcelona, Spain, where she was a professor at the British Institute until 1956. In June 1953, she married Ramón Carnicer in Vallvidrera.

In 1953, the pair founded the School of Modern Languages at the University of Barcelona. From 1953 to 1967 she was professor and head of the English section at the School of Modern Languages. In 1955, she was appointed as the first professor of the newly created department of Germanic Philology at the University of Barcelona. In 1962, she graduated in Philosophy and Letters from the University of Madrid. In 1964, she received her doctorate cum laude in Philosophy and Letters from the University of Barcelona, for her thesis "La otra cara de la justicia" ("The other face of justice"), a study on the world of crime in English literature, for which she received the City of Barcelona prize, and was publisher in 1966 by Plaza & Janés.

MacDermott won the position of Institute chair and taught English Language at the Menéndez Pelayo Institute in Barcelona. In 1967, she was appointed first chair of English Language and Literature of the University of Zaragoza, becoming the first women to hold such a position there, as well as being one of the first nationally, and between 1968 and 1971 she directed UofZ's Institute of Language. In 1971, she became chair of English Language and Literature at the University of Barcelona and directed the English Philology Department from 1971 to 1989.

In 1978 she published the book Aldous Huxley, anticipation and return (Plaza & Janés, 1978) after a long research on Aldous Huxley and his work and a period at the University of California, San Diego. In 1978 she gave a course at the University of Barcelona on the colonisation of Australia. In 1980, she toured Australia, at the invitation of the Australian government.

Between 1990 and 1996, she chaired the European branch of the Association for Commonwealth Literature and Language Studies (ACLALS), dedicated to the study of the language and literature of the English-speaking (Commonwealth) countries such as Canada, Australia, India or Nigeria. MacDermott was a pioneer in the introduction into Spain postcolonial studies and published numerous articles on this subject. A conference named after her is held annually at the University of Barcelona.

She has published books and numerous articles in Spain and other countries, and has collaborated in magazines such as Laye and Historia y Vida and in academic publications in Spain and abroad. She has organised and participated in numerous academic conferences. She has translated numerous books to/from English and also from German and French into Spanish, some in collaboration with her husband. She curated the Universal Classics series for the Editorial Planeta publishing house. She has written encyclopedia articles on the topic of English authors, 16 for the Enciclopedia Salvat and 13 for the Rialp Encyclopedia.

Works

Essays and literary studies 

 Essay on the world of crime according to the testimony of English literature.

 – A profile of 24 English writers with a selection of texts.
 Complete study of the life and work of Aldous Huxley.

.

Theatre 
Rosencrantz and Guildenstern are Dead but they Won’t Lie Down. Barcelona: University Barcelona, 1982,
No Nunneries for Us, (1982).

As author of the introduction, chronology and bibliography 

 (collection)

About Doireann MacDermott

References 

1923 births
Living people
Irish translators
20th-century Irish women writers
Alumni of the University of London
University of Geneva alumni
Complutense University of Madrid alumni
University of Barcelona alumni
Academic staff of the University of Barcelona
Academic staff of the University of Zaragoza
People from County Dublin
20th-century philologists
English–Spanish translators
Spanish–English translators
German–Spanish translators
German–English translators
French–English translators
Irish Hispanists
Irish expatriates in Spain
Irish expatriates in Switzerland
Irish expatriates in the United Kingdom